Remember the Titans is a 2000 American biographical sports film produced by Jerry Bruckheimer and directed by Boaz Yakin. The screenplay, written by Gregory Allen Howard, is based on the true story of coach Herman Boone, portrayed by Denzel Washington, and his attempt to integrate the T. C. Williams High School (now Alexandria City High School) football team in Alexandria, Virginia, in 1971. Will Patton portrays Bill Yoast, Boone's assistant coach. Real-life athletes Gerry Bertier and Julius Campbell are portrayed by Ryan Hurst and Wood Harris, respectively.

The film was co-produced by Walt Disney Pictures and Jerry Bruckheimer Films and released by Buena Vista Pictures. On September 19, 2000, the film's soundtrack was released by Walt Disney Records. It features songs by several recording artists including Creedence Clearwater Revival, Bob Dylan, The Hollies, Marvin Gaye, James Taylor, The Temptations,  Cat Stevens, and Steam.

Remember the Titans had a budget of $30 million and premiered in theaters nationwide in the United States on September 29, 2000. It grossed an estimated $115.6 million in the U.S., and $136.8 million worldwide. The film is often listed among the best football films, but later received criticism from the real-life Titans for its multiple inaccuracies.

Plot

In 1981, a group of former football coaches and players attend a funeral for an unnamed person.

Nearly ten years earlier in the summer of 1971, head coach Bill Yoast of the newly integrated T. C. Williams High School in Alexandria, Virginia, is leading his white players in summer workouts. He is informed that Herman Boone, a black head coach originally hired to coach the city's black high school football team, has been assigned to his coaching staff instead. Then, in an attempt to placate rising racial tensions and the fact that, despite the abolition of racial segregation in public schools, (all other high schools are "white only") the school district decides to name Boone the head coach. He refuses, believing it is unfair to Yoast, a successful coach who is nominated to the Virginia High School Hall of Fame, but relents after seeing what it means to the black community. When Yoast tells his white players that he will accept a head coach position elsewhere, they pledge to boycott the team if he is not their coach. Dismayed at the prospect of the students losing their chances at scholarships, Yoast changes his mind and accepts Boone's offer to serve as his defensive coordinator.

Boone holds his first team meeting with mostly black students in the school gymnasium but is interrupted by the arrival of Yoast and several white students. Yoast accepts Boone's offer to work under him, but Boone warns Yoast that it is his team and he will not tolerate Yoast undermining him. On August 15, the players journey to Gettysburg College for training camp. Early on, the black and white team members frequently clash in racially-motivated conflicts, including that between captains Gerry Bertier and Julius Campbell. However, through forceful coaching, rigorous training, and a motivational early-morning run to the Gettysburg National Cemetery followed by an emotional speech by Boone, the team comes together and returns as a united group. Before their first game, Boone is told by a member of the school board that if he loses even a single game, he will be dismissed. Subsequently, the Titans go through the season undefeated while battling racial prejudice and slowly gaining support from the community. 

Just before the state semi-finals, Yoast is told by the chairman of the school board that they have arranged for the Titans to lose so that Boone will be dismissed and Yoast reinstated as head coach. During the game, the referees make several biased calls against the Titans. Upon seeing the chairman and other board members in the audience looking on with satisfaction, Yoast marches onto the field to warn the head referee that if the game not officiated fairly, he will expose the scandal to the press. After this, the Titans shut out their opponents and advance to the state championship, but Yoast is told by the infuriated chairman that his actions in saving Boone's job have resulted in the loss of his Hall of Fame nomination.

That night, while celebrating the victory, Gerry is severely injured in a car accident and is paralyzed from the waist down. Despite the loss of the All-American linebacker, the team mounts a comeback in the fourth quarter of the state championship and wins the title.

Ten years later, Gerry dies in another car accident caused by a drunk driver after having won the gold medal in shot put in the Paralympic Games. It is his funeral the former football coaches and players were attending in the opening scene. Julius, holding the hand of Bertier's mother, leads the team in a mournful rendition of "Na Na Hey Hey Kiss Him Goodbye".

In the epilogue, descriptions show the players' and coaches' activities after the events in 1971. Coach Boone coached the Titans for five more seasons before retirement, while Coach Yoast assisted Boone for four more years, retiring from coaching in 1990; the two coaches became good friends. After Gerry's death, the gymnasium at T.C. Williams High was renamed after him. Julius would work for the city of Alexandria and remain friends with Gerry until his death.

Cast

Production

Filming
Filming locations for the motion picture included the campus of Berry College in Rome, Georgia, Etowah High School in Woodstock, and in Atlanta, Georgia including Henry Grady High School and Druid Hills High School which both filled in for T.C. Williams High School. Practice scenes were filmed at Clarkston High School in Clarkston Georgia. All home games were filmed in Dallas, Georgia at Paulding County High School. Additionally, some of the championship game scenes were filmed at the Sprayberry High School football stadium in East Marietta, Georgia.

Historical accuracy

As with any movie that is not a documentary film but is rather "based on a true story", it has strayed from the actual events that had occurred on many occasions to add new dramatic elements of teamwork, commitment, and friendship to the film.

 Alexandria City Schools were desegregated in 1959 and T.C. Williams was created by merging three racially integrated schools.
 The Titans were ranked second in the nation at the end of the 1971 season, finishing 13–0. However, despite the movie showing multiple close games, most games were actually blowouts, with 9 of their thirteen wins being shutouts.
 In the movie, Coach Boone states, "We are not like all the other schools in this conference, they're all white. They don't have to worry about race. We do." This is false as well; all the schools the Titans faced were integrated years before.
 While the team is at camp, it shows Coach Boone waking them up at three in the morning to go for a run. This did not occur; neither did his speech at Gettysburg. The team did go on a tour of Gettysburg, although it was not as dramatic as portrayed in the film. In the film on the tour of Gettysburg, Coach Boone said it was the scene where 50,000 men died. There were approximately 46,000 casualties and 8,000 deaths in this battle.
 Ronnie "Sunshine" Bass was far from being the only one with long hair at the time. Even Gerry Bertier had long hair. But in interviews Bass said "I'll say for the record my hair was never that long." He also says the kiss with Gerry never happened.
 The climax of the movie is a fictionalized 1971 AAA state championship football game between T. C. Williams and George C. Marshall High School. The dramatic license taken in the movie was to convert what was actually a mid-season match-up between T. C. Williams and Marshall into a made-for-Hollywood state championship. In reality, the Marshall game was the toughest game T. C. Williams played all year. As depicted in the movie, the real Titans won the Marshall game on a fourth down come-from-behind play at the very end of the game. The actual state championship (against Andrew Lewis High School of Salem) was a 27–0 blowout, played at Victory Stadium in Roanoke, VA.
 Bertier's car accident took place on December 11, 1971, after (rather than a few days before) the season-ending State Championship game. Bertier had been at a banquet honoring the team for their undefeated season. After the banquet, Bertier borrowed his mother's new 1971 Chevrolet Camaro. Bertier lost control of the Camaro and crashed (the movie shows him getting broadsided). The cause of the accident was determined to be a mechanical failure in the engine mounts.
 The "where are they now", shown during the film's closing credits, omits the fact that Sheryl Yoast died in 1996 of an undetected heart condition at the age of 34, and that she was not an only child as she had three sisters. Her oldest sister Bonnie was in college, her second oldest Angela went to a different high school, and her younger sister Deidre was only three years old in 1971.
 The "where are they now" also omits the primary cause of Boone's retirement: He was fired from the school due to allegations of player abuse and coach complaints.

Music
On September 19, 2000, the soundtrack was released by Walt Disney Records. The film score was orchestrated by musician Trevor Rabin and features music composed by various artists. From the instrumental score, Rabin's track "Titans Spirit", was the only cue (of the 12 composed) added to the soundtrack. It is also the only piece of music on the soundtrack album not to have been previously released.

"Titans Spirit" is a seven-minute instrumental. It has been used on numerous sports telecasts, particularly those on NBC, which has utilized the score during its closing credits for each Olympic Games since 2002, as well as the final closing credits montage ending their 12-year run of NBA coverage in 2002. The song was also played as veteran New York Mets players crossed home plate during the closing ceremonies at Shea Stadium, and as the New York Yankees were awarded their rings from their 2009 World Series championship. The New Jersey Devils also used this song during the jersey number retirement ceremonies for Scott Stevens, Ken Daneyko, Scott Niedermayer, Martin Brodeur and Patrik Eliáš. In 2018, at the conclusion of the Stanley Cup playoffs, the song was used during the Washington Capitals' Stanley Cup celebration as captain Alexander Ovechkin lifted the Cup in Las Vegas.

It was also used during the 2008 Democratic National Convention to accompany the celebration and fireworks at Invesco Field after future president Barack Obama gave his nomination acceptance speech, and was also used immediately following his victory speech upon winning the 2008 Presidential Election.

Soundtrack

Certifications

Release

Following its release in theaters, the Region 1 widescreen and Pan and scan edition of the motion picture was released on VHS and DVD in the United States on March 20, 2001. A Special Edition widescreen format of the film was released on March 20, 2001, along with a widescreen Director's cut on March 14, 2006.

A restored widescreen hi-definition Blu-ray version was released by Walt Disney Studios Home Entertainment on September 4, 2007. Special features include backstage feature audio commentary with director Boaz Yakin, producer Jerry Bruckheimer and writer Gregory Allen Howard, feature audio commentary with real-life coaches Herman Boone and Bill Yoast, "Remember The Titans: An inspirational journey behind the scenes" hosted by Lynn Swann, "Denzel Becomes Boone," "Beating The Odds"; Deleted scenes; Movie Showcase and seamless menus.

Reception

Box office
Remember the Titans opened strongly at the U.S. box office, grossing $26,654,715 in its first weekend and staying within the top five for six weeks. The film debuted at the number one spot, but was quickly overtaken by Meet the Parents a week later. It eventually went on to gross an estimated $115,654,751 in the U.S., and $136,706,684 worldwide.

Critical response
Among mainstream critics in the U.S., Remember the Titans received generally positive reviews. Rotten Tomatoes reported that 72% of 137 sampled critics gave the film a positive review, with an average score of 6.3/10. The site's consensus states: "An inspirational crowd-pleaser with a healthy dose of social commentary, Remember the Titans may be predictable, but it's also well-crafted and features terrific performances." At Metacritic, which assigns a weighted average score out of 100 to critics' reviews, the film received a score of 48 based on 32 reviews. Audiences polled by CinemaScore gave the film a rare "A+" grade.

James Berardinelli writing for ReelViews, called the film "relentlessly manipulative and hopelessly predictable" but noted that it was "a notch above the average entry in part because its social message (even if it is soft-) creates a richer fabric than the usual cloth from which this kind of movie is cut." Describing some pitfalls, Robert Wilonsky of the Dallas Observer said that "beneath its rah-rah rhetoric and pigskin proselytizing, it's no more provocative or thoughtful than a Hallmark Hall of Fame film or, for that matter, a Hallmark greeting card. Its heart is in the right place, but it has no soul." Wilonsky however was quick to admit "The film's intentions are noble, but its delivery is ham-fisted and pretentious; you can't deny the message, but you can loathe the messenger without feeling too guilty about it."

Todd McCarthy, writing in Variety, said, "As simplistic and drained of complexity as the picture is, it may well appeal to mainstream audiences as an 'if only it could be like this' fantasy, as well as on the elemental level of a boot camp training film, albeit a PG-rated one with all the cuss words removed." Roger Ebert, in the Chicago Sun-Times, viewed the film as "a parable about racial harmony, yoked to the formula of a sports movie," adding, "Victories over racism and victories over opposing teams alternate so quickly that sometimes we're not sure if we're cheering for tolerance or touchdowns. Real life is never this simple, but then that's what the movies are for".

In the San Francisco Chronicle, Mick LaSalle wrote that the film reminds the viewer that "it's possible to make a sentimental drama that isn't sickening —  and a sports movie that transcends cliches." Columnist Bob Grimm of the Sacramento News & Review, somewhat praised the film, writing, "The film is quite lightweight for the subject matter, but Washington and company make it watchable." Some detractors like Owen Gleiberman of Entertainment Weekly wrote, "Denzel Washington should have held out for a better script before he signed on to star in Remember the Titans, but you can see why he wanted to do the movie: He gets to play Martin Luther King Jr. and Vince Lombardi rolled into one nostalgically omnipotent tough-love saint." Jeff Vice of the Deseret News admitted that although the film contained dialogue that was "corny, clichéd, and downright cheesy at times," as well as how it relayed its message in one of the "most predictable, heavy-handed manners we've seen in a movie in years", the film "serves as a reminder of how much goodness there is inside people, just waiting for the right person to bring it out." He also viewed the casting as top-notch, saying that it helped to have a "rock-solid foundation in the form of leading-man Denzel Washington" at the helm.

Accolades
The film was nominated and won several awards in 2000–2001.

The film is recognized by American Film Institute in these lists:
 2006: AFI's 100 Years ... 100 Cheers – Nominated

References

External links 

 
 
 
 
 
 

2000 films
2000 biographical drama films
2000s sports drama films
African-American biographical dramas
African-American films

Films about racism
Films set in the 1970s
Films set in 1971
Films set in 1981
Films directed by Boaz Yakin
Films set in Virginia
Films shot in Georgia (U.S. state)
Films produced by Jerry Bruckheimer
Films scored by Trevor Rabin
Films about race and ethnicity
High school football films
American sports drama films
Sports films based on actual events
Walt Disney Pictures films
2000s high school films
2000 drama films
2000s English-language films
2000s American films
Tall tales